Sdot Micha (lit. Micha Fields) is a moshav (agricultural settlement) in central Israel. Located to the west of Beit Shemesh, it is under the jurisdiction of the Mateh Yehuda Regional Council.

History
The village was established in 1955 by immigrants from Morocco on the land of the depopulated Palestinian Arab village of Al-Burayj. It was named after Micha Josef Berdyczewski.

It is near Sdot Micha Airbase, which, according to some sources, houses nuclear weapons.

References

Moshavim
Populated places established in 1955
Populated places in Jerusalem District
1955 establishments in Israel
Moroccan-Jewish culture in Israel